Acianthera heringeri is a species of orchid.

heringeri